Cordana is an ascomycete fungus genus. In 2020, it was placed within the monotypic family of Cordanaceae, and within the order Coniochaetales.

The genus name of Cordana is in honour of August Carl Joseph Corda (1809–1849), who was a Czech physician and mycologist.

The genus was circumscribed by Carl Gottlieb Traugott Preuss in Linnaea Vol.24 on pages 100 and 129 in 1851.

Species 
There are about 24 known species;

 Cordana abramovii  
 Cordana andinopatagonica 
 Cordana aquatica 
 Cordana bambusae 
 Cordana bisbyi 
 Cordana boothii 
 Cordana crassa 
 Cordana ellipsoidea 
 Cordana gilibertiae 
 Cordana inaequalis 
 Cordana indica 
 Cordana lignicola 
 Cordana lithuanica 
 Cordana lushanensis 
 Cordana meilingensis 
 Cordana mercadoana 
 Cordana oblongispora 
 Cordana pauciseptata 
 Cordana semaniae 
 Cordana sinensis 
 Cordana solitaria 
 Cordana terrestris 
 Cordana uniseptata 
 Cordana verruculosa 

Former species;
 C. abramovii var. seychellensis  = Cordana abramovii
 C. johnstonii  = Neocordana johnstonii, Pyriculariaceae family
 C. miniumbonata  = Pleurophragmium miniumbonatum, Ascomycota
 C. musae  = Neocordana musae, Pyriculariaceae
 C. parvispora  = Dactylaria parvispora, Helotiales order
 C. polyseptata  = Brachysporium polyseptatum, Trichosphaeriaceae
 C. triseptata  = Exserticlava triseptata, Ascomycota
 C. vasiformis  = Exserticlava vasiformis, Ascomycota
 C. versicolor  = Neocordana versicolor, Pyriculariaceae

References

External links 
 Index Fungorum
 USDA ARS Fungal Database

Ascomycota enigmatic taxa